Eugène Müntz (11 June 1845 in Soultz-sous-Forêts, Bas-Rhin – 30 October 1902 in Paris) was an Alsatian-French art historian.

From 1873 to 1876 he was a member of the École française de Rome. He was a professor of art history at the École des Beaux-arts, where he lectured from 1885 to 1893. He was a specialist on the Italian Renaissance era.

In 1893 he became a member of the Académie des Inscriptions et Belles-Lettres, and in 1898 was elected president of the Société de l'histoire de Paris et de l'Île-de-France.

Literary works 
 Notes sur les mosaïques de l'Italie, 1874–92.
 Les arts à la cour des papes pendant le XVe et le XVIe siècle, 4 Vols., 1878–1898.
 Les précurseurs de la Renaissance, 1881.
 Raphaël, sa vie, son œuvre et son temps, 1881.
 Histoire de la tapisserie, 1882.
 Etudes sur l'histoire de la peinture et de l'iconographie chrétiennes, 1882.

 Histoire de l'art pendant la Renaissance, 3 volumes, 1888–1894
 Léonard da Vinci, l'artiste, le penseur, le savant, translated into English in 1899 and published as Leonardo da Vinci, artist, thinker, and man of science.

Family 
His brother Achille Müntz was an agricultural chemist.

References
 
 

1845 births
1902 deaths
People from Bas-Rhin
French art historians
Members of the Académie des Inscriptions et Belles-Lettres
French male non-fiction writers